Nupserha nigriceps is a species of beetle in the family Cerambycidae. It was described by Charles Joseph Gahan in 1894. It is known from Myanmar, Laos, Malaysia, and Vietnam.

References

nigriceps
Beetles described in 1894